Clyde Cook may refer to:

 Clyde Cook (educator) (1935–2008), president of Biola University, 1982–2007
 Clyde Cook (actor) (1891–1984), Australian-born vaudevillian and actor
 Clyde Cook (cinematographer) (1890–1936), American cinematographer